
This is a list of aircraft in numerical order of manufacturer followed by alphabetical order beginning with 'M'.

Mt

MTC 
(MTC Technologies)
 MTC MQ-17 SpyHawk

References

Further reading

External links 

 List Of Aircraft (M)

fr:Liste des aéronefs (I-M)